Aleksander Narcyz Przezdziecki (29 July 1814 in Chornyi Ostriv – 26 December 1871 in Kraków) was a Polish historian and publisher.

1814 births
1871 deaths
People from Khmelnytskyi Oblast
19th-century Polish historians
Polish male non-fiction writers
Polish publishers (people)
People from the Russian Empire of Polish descent